Zia Mian (Urdu: ضياء میاں  ) is a Pakistani-American physicist, nuclear expert, nuclear policy maker and research scientist at Princeton University.

Currently, he is the director of  the Project on Peace and Security in South Asia, at the Program on Science and Global Security. He is the editor of several books, his books heavily focus on the issues concerning nuclear science, nuclear technology, and Science and technology in Pakistan.  Zia Mian has played a pivotal role in Pakistan's peaceful use of nuclear technology and helped make two documentary films on peace and security in South Asia. Mian has been listed as one of the 15 Asian Scientists To Watch by Asian Scientist Magazine on 15 May 2011. He was named a Fellow of the American Physical Society in 2021.

Documentary films
In 2004, Dr. Zia Mian, along with well-known Pakistani Nuclear Physicist Dr. Pervez Hoodbhoy, produced two documentary films focusing on nuclear issues. In an Interview, Dr. Mian said "The aim of the film was to challenge the national stories common in India, Pakistan and Kashmir and to make a case for living together in plural and diverse democratic societies rather than fighting over borders."
 Crossing the Lines: Kashmir, Pakistan, India (2004)
 Pakistan and India Under the Nuclear Shadow (2001)

Journals and Scientific Papers
 Nuclear War in South Asia with Matthew McKinzie, Zia Mian and A. H. Nayyar,
 The Nuclear Confrontation in South Asia with Zia Mian,
 Feeding potential for South Asia’s nuclear fire with Zia Mian and Frank von Hippel
 Fissile Materials in South Asia and the Implications of the U.S.-India Nuclear Deal with Zia Mian, A.H. Nayyar, and R. Rajaraman, p
 Stepping away from the Nuclear Abyss with Zia Mian
 Beyond Missile Defense with Andrew Lichterman, Zia Mian and Jurgen Scheffran
 Nuclear War in South Asia with Matthew McKinzie, Zia Mian and A. H. Nayyar
 Wrong Ends, Means, and Needs: Behind the U.S. Nuclear Deal with India with Zia Mia
 A time of testing?, Zia Mian and A.H. Nayyar
 Perspectives - Sanctions: Lift 'em, Pervez Hoodbhoy, Zia Mian
 Plutonium dispersal and health hazards from nuclear weapon accidents, Zia Mian, M V Ramana, R Rajaraman
 THE NEXT GENERATION OF NUCLEAR WEAPONS - Global debate - SOUTH ASIA, RUSSIA, CHINA & THE MIDDLE EAST - ZIA MIAN, M. V. RAMANA, ALEXANDER A. PIKAYEV, DINGLI SHEN & SAIDEH LOTFIAN warn that RRW might prompt states to reevaluate their nuclear postures—And not for the better. Zia Mian, M V Ramana, Alexander A Pikayev, Dingli Shen, Saideh Lotfian
 Resource Letter PSNAC-1: Physics and society: Nuclear arms control Alexander Glaser, Zia Mian
 Response to Zia Mian's 'How Not to Handle Nuclear Security'
 Nuclear Passions and Interests:The Founding of Atomic Pakistan by Zia Mian

Bibliography
 The nuclear debate: Ironies and immoralities (1998)
 Out of the Nuclear Shadow (2002)
 Memories of Fire (2006)
 Forestalling Another Rain of Ruin: The Need to Abolish Nuclear Weapons (2008)
 Rule of Force vs. Rule of Law in Pakistan (2008)
 Pakistan’s Atomic Bomb and the Search for Security (2001)
South Asian cultures of the bomb: atomic publics and the state in India and Pakistan

References

 https://web.archive.org/web/20100622195722/https://wws.princeton.edu/people/display_person.xml?netid=zia&all=yes
 http://cstsp.aaas.org/content.html?contentid=431
 http://www.sacw.net/auteur246.html
 http://worldfocus.org/blog/tag/zia-mian/
 http://www.princeton.edu/main/news/archive/S22/53/79K80/index.xml?section=featured
 http://www.princeton.edu/main/news/multimedia/
 https://www.amazon.com/Out-Nuclear-Shadow-Smitu-Kothari/dp/1842770594

External links
 https://web.archive.org/web/20091026151725/http://geocities.com/m_v_ramana/nuclear.html
 https://web.archive.org/web/20080522125505/http://www.peaceworkmagazine.org/taxonomy/term/49
 https://www.youtube.com/watch?v=EWhdKECoqSM

Pakistani physicists
Alumni of Newcastle University
Princeton University faculty
Pakistani emigrants to the United States
Pakistani science journalists
Pakistani anti–nuclear weapons activists
Year of birth missing (living people)
Living people
Academic staff of Quaid-i-Azam University
American academics of Pakistani descent
Fellows of the American Physical Society